The John Jay Educational Campus is a New York City Department of Education facility at 237 Seventh Avenue between 4th and 5th Streets in the Park Slope neighborhood of Brooklyn, New York City.  Formerly the location of John Jay High School (originally Manual Training High School), which was closed in 2004 due to poor student performance, the facility now houses John Jay School for Law (K462), Cyberarts Studio Academy (K463), Park Slope Collegiate (K464, formerly the Secondary School for Research) and Millennium Brooklyn High School (K684) .

The building was constructed in 1902. It was designed by C. B. J. Snyder in the Modern French Renaissance style.

Notable alumni

 Zaid Abdul-Aziz, professional basketball player.
 Jean-Michel Basquiat, artist
 Louise Buckley, artist
 John J. Buro, sports writer.
 Linwood G. Dunn, pioneer of visual special effects in motion pictures.
 Henri Ford, pediatric surgeon.
 Anthony Lolli, real estate developer.
 Davi Napoleon, née Davida Skurnick, theater historian and arts journalist
 Joe Pepitone, major league baseball player, notably with the New York Yankees.
 Isidor Isaac Rabi, recipient of the 1944 Nobel Prize in Physics.
 Doc Rankin, cartoonist
 Thelma Ritter, actress.
 Nitty Scott, rapper.
 Jack Ryan, Basketball player and NYC streetball legend. 
 Alexander Scourby, actor.
 Henny Youngman, comedian.
 Sam Parrilla, Major League Baseball outfielder for Philadelphia Phillies.
 Harry Sylvester, and American author and journalist, recipient of the O. Henry Prize.
 Kenneth D. Molloy, New York State Supreme Court Justice, recipient of the Silver Star.

See also
 List of high schools in New York City

References

External links

InsideSchools article on proposed school, 2010
New York Times article on school closure, 2001
Times article on controversies in school redesign, March 3, 2002
(May 2003) Secondary School for Law, Journalism, and Research, "an administrative nightmare for the district," bans journalist
Secondary School for Research

Defunct high schools in Brooklyn
Park Slope
Public high schools in Brooklyn